Jurong East Bus Interchange is a bus interchange located in Jurong East, Singapore. An open-air single-level bus terminal, it is connected to the adjacent Jurong East MRT station via a link bridge.

History

The original facility used for the bus interchange was built on 30 June 1985, west of the present MRT station and opposite the Jurong CPF building at Jurong Gateway Road. Most of the bus services in the bus interchange originated from the Teban Gardens Terminal and some from the former Jurong Bus Interchange, which were re-routed to this interchange when it opened. For years, despite being in the zone marked as Jurong Regional Centre, the bus interchange had a rather low level of passenger flow as compared to the larger Boon Lay Bus Interchange serving Jurong West New Town, the Jurong Industrial Estate, as well as institutions in the west including the Nanyang Technological University. The interchange serves mainly commuters travelling to the various housing estates, schools, religious places, tourist attractions and industrial places in Jurong East and those travelling to Malaysia via 2nd Link (Tuas Checkpoint).

Redevelopment plans 
Following the redevelopments in Jurong, the original facility had been slated to be rebuilt into an air-conditioned facility as part of a commercial development on the site, which the commercial development and surrounding commercial places, together with the MRT station, will be collectively known as the Jurong East Integrated Transport Hub, similar to the rest of earlier hubs built. The rebuilding plan came along with the other plots of land surrounding the original facility being sold off to developers for commercial developments on 27 October 2010 when the Land Transport Authority released a tender for a "Proposed Jurong East Temporary Bus Interchange" indicating the redevelopment of the bus interchange. The land (MK05-08622X) occupied by the original facility was to be acquired by Singapore Land Authority for development into a commercial centre 10 years later and the original interchange to relocate to a temporary facility. The construction of the temporary facility spanned from middle of 2011 to the end of 2011. 

The temporary facility is located at the south of the MRT station along Jurong Gateway Road, roughly 0.2 km South-East from the original facility, opposite JCube at the western end of it and the JTC Corporation headquarters at the eastern end. It has the same colour scheme of red as the original facility and it somewhat resembles the temporary facility used by Boon Lay Temporary Bus Interchange.The temporary bus interchange brought about changes in routes. The bus stop outside Block 131 is now being reused after the Jurong East Modification Project. All former end-on bus services (except for Service 98 and 98M) now call at the bus stop outside Jurong Seventh-Day Adventist Church.

In 2015, Services 715, 716, 717 and PCS shuttle service were relocated to start from the bus stop at Jurong East Stn/Int along Boon Lay Way.

Development of Jurong Regional Line 
The temporary bus interchange was relocated to the interim bus interchange near the western end of JCube, bordered by Jurong Town Hall Road, Jurong East Street 12 & Jurong Gateway Road on 6 December 2020, lasting until 2027 at the minimum. The existing temporary bus interchange will be demolished to make way for an integrated transport hub with Jurong Region line's Jurong East station. Due to the lack of parking space in the interim interchange, bus service 78 will start at Blk 131 along Jurong Gateway Road whereas CW3 and CW4 will be relocated to the Private pick-up/drop-off point along Venture Avenue. Bus service 97, 97e, 197 & 333 will skip Jurong East Central (Blk 134) and Jurong Town Hall Road (Jurong East Library). Full-day bus lanes will be implemented at Jurong Gateway Road. Bus Service 79 will start at Boon Lay Bus Interchange and loop at Blk 131 where 78 starts.

Bus Contracting Model

Under the new bus contracting model, all Singaporean run bus routes were split into 7 route packages - 52 under Bishan-Toa Payoh, 506 under TBC, 51 under Sengkang-Hougang, 105 under Serangoon-Eunos, 160/160M under Bukit Merah, 197 under Clementi and the rest are under Bulim Bus Packages.

In May 2015, the Land Transport Authority announced Tower Transit the successful tenderer of the Bulim Bus Package. This package comprises 15 services originating from Jurong East Bus Interchange, including the newly-introduced services 41, 143M and the amended service 49. Tower Transit took over operations of these services out of Bulim Bus Depot, and also operates in Clementi Bus Interchange, along with operating and maintaining Bukit Batok Bus Interchange.

There is no change to the operator of cross-border services CW3 and CW4, which continue to be operated by Causeway Link of Malaysia.

References

External links
 
 

Bus stations in Singapore
Jurong East